Megalota fallax is a moth of the family Tortricidae first described by Edward Meyrick in 1909. It is found in Thailand, India, Sri Lanka and Laos.

References

Moths described in 1909
Olethreutini